Golam Mostafa is a Bangladesh Nationalist Party politician and the former Member of Parliament of Joypurhat-2.

Career
Mostafa was elected to parliament from Joypurhat-2 as a Bangladesh Nationalist Party candidate in 2008.

References

Bangladesh Nationalist Party politicians
Living people
9th Jatiya Sangsad members
Year of birth missing (living people)